The decade of the 1350s in art involved some significant events.

Events
 1351: Francesco Talenti succeeds Andrea Pisano as director of the works of the Florence Cathedral
 1352: Peter Parler becomes the master mason of Saint Vitus Cathedral

Works

c. 1350 Huang Gongwang paints Dwelling in the Fuchun Mountains
1352 Tommaso da Modena paints a fresco cycle of 40 Dominican scholars at their desks, in the chapter house of the convent of San Nicolò, Treviso
c. 1359 Orcagna completes the tabernacle in Orsanmichele

Births
 1355: Melchior Broederlam – Early Netherlandish painter (died 1411)
 1355: Jacquemart de Hesdin – French miniature painter working in the Late Gothic style (died 1414)
 1351: Antonio Bamboccio – Italian painter and sculptor of the Gothic period (died 1421)
 1350: Lluís Borrassà – Spanish Gothic Era painter (died 1424)
 1350: Agnolo Gaddi – Italian painter (died 1396)
 1350: Spinello Aretino – Italian painter of frescoes (died 1410)
 1350: Lorenzo di Bicci – Italian painter of the Florentine school (died 1427)

Deaths
 1359: Wang Mian – Chinese painter of plums during the Yuan Dynasty (born 1287)
 1358: Jacopo del Casentino – Italian fresco painter active mainly in Tuscany (born 1297)
 1358: Paolo Veneziano – medieval painter from Venice (born before 1333)
 1357: Evrard d'Orleans – French sculptor (born 1292)
 1356: Lippo Memmi – Italian painter from Siena (born 1291)
 1355: Cao Zhibai – Chinese painter and bibliophile from the Yuan Dynasty (born 1272)
 1355: Jean Pucelle – Parisian Gothic-era manuscript illuminator (born 1300)
 1354: Wu Zhen – Chinese painter during the Yuan dynasty (born 1280)
 1350: Huáng Gōngwàng – Chinese painter from Jiangsu during the Yuan Dynasty (born 1269)
 1350: Stefano Fiorentino –  Italian fresco painter (born 1301)
 c. 1350: Maso di Banco – Italian fresco painter from Florence (born unknown)

 
Years of the 14th century in art
Art